The 2023 LCK season was the twelfth season of South Korea's LCK, a professional esports league for the MOBA PC game League of Legends.

The regular season format was double round robin. The games were played five days per week for both round robins.

The spring split began on 18 January and will finish on 19 March, immediately would be followed by the spring playoffs on 22 March, which would then conclude with the spring finals.

Starting from 2023 season, LCK introduced new format for the playoffs, where double elimination would be applied starting from the semifinals. LCK also eliminated the rules for call-up and send-down between LCK and LCK Challengers League from this season.

Broadcasting 
The LCK was broadcast at the following platforms:

  Korean: Naver, Afreeca TV
  English: Twitch, YouTube
  Chinese: HuyaTV
  French: OTP
  Vietnam: YouTube, Facebook
  Japan: Twitch

Spring

Playoffs

Awards

References 

League of Legends
Sports leagues in South Korea
2023 multiplayer online battle arena tournaments
League of Legends Champions Korea seasons